Crofton Downs railway station is one of eight stations on the Johnsonville Branch, a commuter branch railway north of Wellington in New Zealand’s North Island. It serves the suburb of Crofton Downs. Its name is similar to the pre-1908 name for the different Ngaio station, Crofton.

Electric multiple unit trains are operated by Transdev under the Metlink brand through this station in both directions to Johnsonville (to the north) and Wellington (to the south). The station is one of four stations on the line located on a curve; before arrival at the Crofton Downs or Awarua Street stations, the onboard announcement adds Please mind the gap when exiting the train.

History
Crofton Downs is the most recent station on the Johnsonville Branch, having been opened in 1963 to serve the then new suburb of Crofton Downs. Patronage of the station was light in its early years, not becoming popular until housing in the area was well developed.

Services
Trains run in both directions through this station, departing at half-hourly intervals, supplemented by a 13/13/26 schedule at peak times on week days.

The 22 bus route connects the station to Johnsonville and Wellington.

Facilities
This station has a single side platform, passenger shelter, and commuter car park. Behind the station is a Mitre-10 hardware store and customer car park.

In 2019/20 the GWRC planned to "renew" the Crofton Downs railway station.

Footnotes

External links
 Train timetable from Metlink

Rail transport in Wellington
Public transport in the Wellington Region
Buildings and structures in Wellington City
Railway stations in New Zealand
Railway stations opened in 1963